Clara Young (born Khaya-Risye Shpikolitser  c. 1882 in Zlotshev, Galicia) was a Yiddish theatrical actor. Born to parents who loved the stage, she spent her early years in a home that housed rehearsals of traveling Yiddish theater troupes. After her father's death the family went to America, where she soon joined the Tantsman company and went to Boston, there to Zolotarevski's troupe in Montreal, thence to Toronto and to Morris Finkel's theater in Philadelphia.

In 1903 she played in the People's Music Hall where she made a name with songs like Di dame fun Broadvey and Libe mayne. In 1909 she went over to the Thalia Theater where her husband Boaz Young was part owner. Here she played serious roles for the first time, Tsipeniu and Got, mentsh un tayvl (God, man and devil) and Kreutzer Sonata and in Dos yidishe harts singing the couplet Sigmund Mogulesko wrote for her, Ikh hob es punkt vi in der heym. She played in Di bigamistin (zayn vayb's man) which, along with Avrom Shomer's Alrightnikes, she and her husband took to London in 1911 and then to the Lodz Groys teater and Warsaw's Elyseum Theater. Her success encouraged the couple to return to Warsaw, where in 1912 she starred in Anshel Schorr and Joseph Rumshinsky's Dos meydl fun der vest (Di Amerikanerin) and later Khantshe in Amerike and Alma, vu voynstu? (Alma, where do you live?) and the German operetta Puptshik.

According to scholar Nina Warnke, Young became "the most beloved Yiddish actress in Poland and Russia during the 1910s" – popular not only among Yiddish-speaking operetta audiences but also among non-Jewish Poles and Russians. Yiddish intellectuals and literati in Warsaw, including critics A. Mukdoyni (pseudonym of Alexander Kappel), Noach Prilutski, Dovid Frishman, and I. L. Peretz, held her acting in high esteem, despite their general ambivalence about the influx of American plays and actors into Europe at that time. Although not all of the plays in her repertoire were set in the United States, she cultivated a profile of an American playing American characters. Young's husband Boas, in his memoir Mayn Lebn (1950), recalled the broad appeal of the musical Di amerikanerin among Warsaw's diverse Jewish population:
Masses of Poles came to see Di amerikanerin; Warsaw assimilators were not embarrassed to come to the Yiddish theater ... young Hasidim would sneak into the theater ... [and] Jewish literati saw in Clara Young's performances a revival of the Yiddish language. He noted that the play's music (composed by Rumshinsky) "could be heard in all cabarets", where it was sung by Jews and non-Jews alike.

Young's popularity grew when she starred in her husband's Jeykele the bluffer. In 1922 she starred in the premiere of Boris Thomashefsky's Di grine kuzine. In 1923, at the Prospect Theater, she played the title role in Der yeshiva bokher (The schoolboy), soon after traveling in Poland and the Soviet Union for several years, then Argentina and Brazil in 1928, then back to Lodz, Warsaw, Riga and Vilna in the 1930s, then Paris, Berlin, and London, Belgium, Mexico and Cuba.

Subsequently, Clara Young returned alone to the Soviet Union, became a Soviet citizen, and spent the rest of her life there. In 1941 Young was among friends that the Polish-born actress Ida Kamińska met up with in Tashkent when all were temporarily stuck there under the wartime conditions. Young died in Moscow in 1952.

References

1880s births
1952 deaths

Year of birth uncertain
Yiddish theatre
Yiddish theatre performers
Jews from Galicia (Eastern Europe)